The following outline is provided as an overview of and topical guide to Benin:

Benin – country in West Africa.  Benin borders Togo to the west, Nigeria to the east and Burkina Faso and Niger to the north; its short coastline to the south leads to the Bight of Benin. Its capital is Porto Novo, but the seat of government is Cotonou. Benin was known as Dahomey until 1975.

General reference

 Pronunciation:
 Common English country name: Benin
 Official English country name: The Republic of Benin
 Common endonym(s): List of countries and capitals in native languages
 Official endonym(s): List of official endonyms of present-day nations and states
 Adjectival(s): Beninese  
 Demonym(s):Beninese
 Etymology: Name of Benin
 ISO country codes: BJ, BEN, 204
 ISO region codes: See ISO 3166-2:BJ
 Internet country code top-level domain: .bj

Geography of Benin 

Geography of Benin
 Benin is: a country
 Population of Benin: 8,439,000(2005) - 89th most populous country
 Area of Benin:  - 101st largest country
 Atlas of Benin

Location 
 Benin is situated within the following regions:
 Northern Hemisphere and Eastern Hemisphere
 Africa
 West Africa
 Time zone: West Africa Time (UTC+01)
 Extreme points of Benin
 High: Mont Sokbaro 
 Low: Bight of Benin 0 m
 Land boundaries:  1,989 km
 773 km
 644 km
 306 km
 266 km
 Coastline:  121 km

Environment of Benin 

 Climate of Benin
 Ecoregions in Benin
 Protected areas of Benin
 National parks of Benin
 Wildlife of Benin
 Fauna of Benin
 Birds of Benin
 Mammals of Benin

Natural geographic features of Benin 

 Glaciers in Benin: none
 Lakes of Benin
 Lake Ahémé
 Lake Nokoué
 Rivers of Benin
 Couffo River
 Mono River
 Niger River
 Alibori River
 Mékrou River
 Oti River
 Sota River
 Ouémé River
 World Heritage Sites in Benin

Regions of Benin

Ecoregions of Benin 

List of ecoregions in Benin

Administrative divisions of Benin 

Subdivisions of Benin
 Provinces of Benin
 Departments of Benin
 Communes of Benin

Departments of Benin 
Benin is divided into 12 departments:
Alibori*
Atakora
Atlantique
Borgou
Collines*
Donga*
Kouffo*
Littoral*
Mono
Ouémé
Plateau*
Zou

Communes of Benin
There are 77 communes in Benin.

Municipalities of Benin 

 Capital of Benin: Porto Novo
 Cities of Benin
 Abomey
 Abomey-Calavi
 Allada
 Aplahoué
 Athiémé
 Banikoara
 Bassila
 Bembèrèkè
 Bohicon
 Bori
 Boukoumbé
 Bétérou
 Comé
 Cotonou
 Cové
 Dassa-Zoumé
 Djougou
 Dogbo-Tota
 Ganvie
 Gogounou
 Grand Popo
 Kandi
 Karimama
 Kouandé
 Kérou
 Kétou
 Lokossa
 Malanville
 Natitingou
 Ndali (Benin)
 Nikki, Benin
 Ouidah
 Parakou
 Pobé
 Porga
 Porto-Novo
 Péhonko
 Sakété
 Savalou
 Savé
 Segboroué
 Ségbana
 Tanguietta
 Tanguiéta
 Tchaourou

Demography of Benin 

Demographics of Benin

Government and politics of Benin 

Politics of Benin
 Form of government: Presidential representative democratic republic
 Capital of Benin: Porto Novo
 Elections in Benin
 Political parties in Benin
 Action Front for Renewal and Development
 African Movement for Development and Progress
 Alliance for Social Democracy
 Alliance of Progress Forces (Benin)
 Benin Rebirth Party
 Builders and Managers of Freedom and Democracy
 Communist Party of Benin
 Congress of People for Progress
 Democratic Renewal Party (Benin)
 Hope Force
 Impulse to Progress and Democracy
 Key Force
 Liberal Democrats' Rally for National Reconstruction-Vivoten
 Marxist-Leninist Communist Party of Benin
 Movement for Citizens' Commitment and Awakening
 Movement for Development and Solidarity
 Movement for Development by Culture
 Movement for the People's Alternative
 National Party "Together"
 National Rally for Democracy (Benin)
 New Alliance
 Party of Construction and Labour
 People's Republican Union
 Rally for Democracy and Progress (Benin)
 Party of Salvation
 Social Democratic Party (Benin)
 Star Alliance (Benin)
 The Greens (Benin)
 Union for Democracy and National Solidarity
 Union for Future Benin
 Union for Homeland and Labour
 Union for the Nation
 Union of Communists of Dahomey

Branches of government

Government of Benin

Executive branch of the government of Benin 
 Head of state: President of Benin
 Head of government: Prime Minister of Benin

Legislative branch of the government of Benin 

 National Assembly of Benin (unicameral parliament)

Judicial branch of the government of Benin 

 High Court of Justice of Benin – made up of members of the Constitutional Court, Parliament and the president of the Supreme Court. It alone can judge the President.

Foreign relations of Benin 

Foreign relations of Benin
 Diplomatic missions in Benin
 Diplomatic missions of Benin
 United States-Benin relations

International organization membership 
The Republic of Benin is a member of:

African Development Bank Group (AfDB)
African Union (AU)
African, Caribbean, and Pacific Group of States (ACP)
Conference des Ministres des Finances des Pays de la Zone Franc (FZ)
Council of the Entente (Entente)
Economic Community of West African States (ECOWAS)
Food and Agriculture Organization (FAO)
Group of 77 (G77)
International Atomic Energy Agency (IAEA)
International Bank for Reconstruction and Development (IBRD)
International Civil Aviation Organization (ICAO)
International Criminal Court (ICCt)
International Criminal Police Organization (Interpol)
International Development Association (IDA)
International Federation of Red Cross and Red Crescent Societies (IFRCS)
International Finance Corporation (IFC)
International Fund for Agricultural Development (IFAD)
International Labour Organization (ILO)
International Maritime Organization (IMO)
International Monetary Fund (IMF)
International Olympic Committee (IOC)
International Organization for Migration (IOM)
International Organization for Standardization (ISO) (correspondent)
International Red Cross and Red Crescent Movement (ICRM)
International Telecommunication Union (ITU)
International Telecommunications Satellite Organization (ITSO)
International Trade Union Confederation (ITUC)
Inter-Parliamentary Union (IPU)

Islamic Development Bank (IDB)
Multilateral Investment Guarantee Agency (MIGA)
Nonaligned Movement (NAM)
Organisation internationale de la Francophonie (OIF)
Organisation of Islamic Cooperation (OIC)
Organisation for the Prohibition of Chemical Weapons (OPCW)
Organization of American States (OAS) (observer)
Permanent Court of Arbitration (PCA)
United Nations (UN)
United Nations Conference on Trade and Development (UNCTAD)
United Nations Educational, Scientific, and Cultural Organization (UNESCO)
United Nations High Commissioner for Refugees (UNHCR)
United Nations Industrial Development Organization (UNIDO)
United Nations Mission in Liberia (UNMIL)
United Nations Mission in the Sudan (UNMIS)
United Nations Operation in Cote d'Ivoire (UNOCI)
United Nations Organization Mission in the Democratic Republic of the Congo (MONUC)
Universal Postal Union (UPU)
West African Development Bank (WADB) (regional)
West African Economic and Monetary Union (WAEMU)
World Confederation of Labour (WCL)
World Customs Organization (WCO)
World Federation of Trade Unions (WFTU)
World Health Organization (WHO)
World Intellectual Property Organization (WIPO)
World Meteorological Organization (WMO)
World Tourism Organization (UNWTO)
World Trade Organization (WTO)

Law and order in Benin 

 Constitution of Benin
 Crime in Benin
 Human rights in Benin
 LGBT rights in Benin
 Freedom of religion in Benin
 Law enforcement in Benin

Military of Benin 

Military of Benin
 Command
 Commander-in-chief:
 Forces
 Army of Benin
 Navy of Benin
 Air Force of Benin

History of Benin 

History of Benin
 History of Benin
 Amedzofe (history)
 Béhanzin
 Benin Empire
 Borgu
 Colonial heads of São João Baptista de Ajudá
 Cotonou Agreement
 Ketu (Benin)
 List of presidents of Benin
 People's Republic of Benin
 Punitive Expedition of 1897
 Rulers of the Bariba state of Nikki
 Rulers of the Fon state of Alada
 Rulers of the Fon state of Savi Hweda

Dahomey
 Dahomey
 Abomey
 Adandozan
 Agaja
 Agoli-agbo
 Agonglo
 Akaba
 Arrada
 Battle of Abomey
 Béhanzin
 Colonial heads of Benin (Dahomey)
 Dahomey Amazons
 Dahomey War
 First Franco-Dahomean War
 Second Franco-Dahomean War
 Dakodonou
 Gangnihessou
 Ghezo
 Glele
 Houegbadja
 Kpengla
 Rulers of the Fon state of Danhome
 Tegbessou
 The annual customs of Dahomey
 West African Vodun

Disasters in Benin
 UTA Flight 141

Elections in Benin
 Elections in Benin
 Benin presidential election, 2001
 Beninese presidential election, 2006
 Dahomey legislative election, 1959

Culture of Benin 

Culture of Benin
 Buildings and structures in Benin
 Sports venues in Benin
 Stade de l'Amitié
 Football venues in Benin
 L'Aube Nouvelle
 Media in Benin
 Mythology in Benin
 Dahomey mythology
 Dahomey deities
 Nana Buluku
 Dahomey goddesses
 Gleti
 Mahu
 Dahomey gods
 Xevioso
 National symbols of Benin
 Coat of arms of Benin
 Flag of Benin
 National anthem of Benin
 Public holidays in Benin
 World Heritage Sites in Benin
 Royal Palaces of Abomey
 Guides du Bénin
 Scoutisme Béninois

Art in Benin 
 Literature of Benin
 Beninese writers
 Music of Benin
 Gangbe brass band
 Beninese hip hop

Ethnic groups in Benin
 Aja people
 Ewe people
 Fon people
 Tem peopleTem people
 Gurma
 Mahi people
 Rulers of the Gurma Mossi state of Nungu
 Yoruba people
 Yoruba language
 Yoruba twins

Languages of Benin
 Languages of Benin
 Fon language
 Gen language
 Kabiyé language
 Phla–Pherá languages
 Yoruba language
 Mina
 Goun
 Dendi
 Natimba

Religion in Benin
 Religion in Benin
 Christianity in Benin
 Celestial Church of Christ
 Roman Catholicism in Benin
 Islam in Benin

Sports in Benin

Football in Benin
 Football in Benin
 Benin national football team
 Benin Football Federation

Benin at the Olympics
 Benin at the Olympics
 Benin at the 1980 Summer Olympics
 Benin at the 1984 Summer Olympics
 Benin at the 1988 Summer Olympics
 Benin at the 1992 Summer Olympics
 Benin at the 1996 Summer Olympics
 Benin at the 2000 Summer Olympics
 Benin at the 2004 Summer Olympics

Economy and infrastructure of Benin 

Economy of Benin
 Economic rank, by nominal GDP (2007): 136th (one hundred and thirty sixth)
 Agriculture in Benin
 Fishing in Benin
 Communications in Benin
 Internet in Benin
 Companies of Benin
Currency of Benin: Franc
ISO 4217: XOF
 Energy in Benin
 Health in Benin
 Mineral industry of Benin
 Mining in Benin
 Tourism in Benin
 Visa policy of Benin
 Trade unions in Benin
 Autonomous Trade Unions Centre
 General Confederation of the Workers of Benin
 National Union of the Unions of the Workers of Benin
 Transport in Benin
 Air transport in Benin
 Airports in Benin
 Cadjehoun Airport
 Airlines of Benin
 Aero Benin
 Afric'Air Charter
 Afrique Airlines
 Benin Golf Air
 Trans Air Benin
 West African Airlines
 Zircon Airways Benin
 Rail transport in Benin
 Water supply and sanitation in Benin

Education in Benin 

Education in Benin

Health in Benin 

Health in Benin

Beninese people
 Grace d'Almeida
 Bernardin Gantin
 Kojo Tovalou Houénou
 Djimon Hounsou
 Jacob U. Egharevba
 Théophile Nata
 Pierre Osho
 Zomahoun Idossou Rufin
 Ismaël Tidjani Serpos
 Rosine Vieyra Soglo
 Arlette Claudine Kpèdétin Dagnon Vignikin - Ambassador

Beninese musicians
 Angélique Kidjo
 Zeynab Habib

Beninese politicians
 List of presidents of Benin
 Justin Ahomadegbé-Tomêtin
 Alphonse Amadou Alley
 Bruno Amoussou
 Sourou-Migan Apithy
 Martin Azonhiho
 Rogatien Biaou
 Yayi Boni
 Tahirou Congacou
 Mariam Aladji Boni Diallo
 Frédéric Dohou
 Pascal Fantodji
 Jerome Sacca Kina Guezere
 Adrien Houngbédji
 Simon Idohou
 Mathieu Kérékou
 Maurice Kouandété
 Hubert Maga
 Théophile Nata
 Pierre Osho
 Orou Gabé Orou Sego
 Ismaël Tidjani Serpos
 Seïdou Mama Sika
 Christophe Soglo
 Nicéphore Soglo
 Rosine Vieyra Soglo
 Émile Zinsou

Beninese sportspeople

Beninese footballers
 Anicet Adjamonsi
 Moustapha Agnidé
 Maxime Agueh
 Jocelyn Ahouéya
 Rodrigue Akpakoun
 Romuald Boco
 Rachad Chitou
 Damien Chrysostome
 Adigo Dinalo
 Laurent D'Jaffo
 Alain Gaspoz
 Réda Johnson
 Moussoro Kabirou
 Moussa Latoundji
 Mouritala Ogunbiyi
 Jonas Okétola
 Sylvain Remy
 Stéphane Sessegnon
 Félicien Singbo
 Samuel Emmanuel Suka
 Omar Tchomogo
 Seydath Tchomogo
 Tony Toklomety
 Oladipupo Wassiou

Beninese football referees
 Coffi Codjia

Beninese writers
 List of Beninese writers
 Olympe Bhely-Quenum
 Paulin J. Hountondji

See also 

Index of Benin-related articles
List of Benin-related topics
List of international rankings
Member state of the United Nations
Outline of Africa
Outline of geography

 Stubs
 Action Front for Renewal and Development
 Adigo Dinalo
 Aero Benin
 Afric'Air Charter
 African Movement for Development and Progress
 Alain Gaspoz
 Alliance for Social Democracy
 Alliance of Progress Forces (Benin)
 Alphonse Amadou Alley
 Anicet Adjamonsi
 Antoine Idji Kolawolé
 Autonomous Trade Unions Centre
 Benin Rebirth Party
 Bruno Amoussou
 Builders and Managers of Freedom and Democracy
 Christophe Soglo
 Coffi Codjia
 Communist Party of Benin
 Congress of People for Progress
 Damien Chrysostome
 Emile Derlin Zinsou
 Frédéric Dohou
 Félicien Singbo
 Gangbe brass band
 Hope Force
 Houegbadja
 Hubert Maga
 Impulse to Progress and Democracy
 Islam in Benin
 Ismaël Tidjani Serpos
 Jacob U. Egharevba
 Jerome Sacca Kina Guezere
 Jocelyn Ahouéya
 Jonas Okétola
 Justin Ahomadegbé-Tomêtin
 Key Force
 Laurent D'Jaffo
 Liberal Democrats' Rally for National Reconstruction-Vivoten
 Mariam Aladji Boni Diallo
 Marxist-Leninist Communist Party of Benin
 Maurice Kouandété
 Maxime Agueh
 Michel Aikpé
 Military of Benin
 Mouritala Ogunbiyi
 Moussa Latoundji
 Moussoro Kabirou
 Moustapha Agnidé
 Movement for Citizens' Commitment and Awakening
 Movement for Development and Solidarity
 Movement for Development by Culture
 Movement for the People's Alternative
 National Party "Together"
 National Rally for Democracy (Benin)
 New Alliance
 Olympe Bhely-Quenum
 Omar Tchomogo
 Orou Gabé Orou Sego
 Party of Construction and Labour
 Pascal Fantodji
 People's Republic of Benin
 People's Republican Union
 Pierre Osho
 Public holidays in Benin
 Rachad Chitou
 Rally for Democracy and Progress (Benin)
 Rodrigue Akpakoun
 Rogatien Biaou
 Roman Catholicism in Benin
 Rosine Vieyra Soglo
 Party of Salvation
 Samuel Emmanuel Suka
 Seydath Tchomogo
 Seïdou Mama Sika
 Simon Idohou
 Social Democratic Party (Benin)
 Sourou-Migan Apithy
 Star Alliance (Benin)
 Sylvain Remy
 Tahirou Congacou
 Template:Benin-stub
 The Greens (Benin)
 Tony Toklomety
 Union for Democracy and National Solidarity
 Union for Future Benin
 Union for Homeland and Labour
 Union for the Nation
 Union of Communists of Dahomey
 Zircon Airways Benin
 Émile Zinsou

References

External links

 Government
Benin Government Portal (official site)

 News
allAfrica - Benin news headline links
quotidien le martinal
ORTB - Office of Radio & Television Benin

 Overviews
BBC News - Country Study: Benin
Benin. The World Factbook. Central Intelligence Agency
US State Department - Benin includes Background Notes, Country Study and major reports
World Bank Country Brief: Benin

 Directories
Columbia University Libraries - Benin directory category of the WWW-VL

Stanford University - Africa South of the Sahara: Benin directory category
Japan Africa Network

 Tourism

Benin's photogallery

Benin
Benin